The Dumont River (in French: rivière Dumont) is a tributary of the Nicolet River which flows on the south shore of the St. Lawrence River. The Dumont River flows entirely in the municipality of Chesterville, in the Arthabaska Regional County Municipality (MRC), in the administrative region of Centre-du-Québec, in Quebec, in Canada.

Geography 

The neighboring hydrographic slopes of the Dumont River are:
 north side: Brooks River, Bulstrode River, L'Heureux stream;
 east side: Gobeil stream, Bulstrode River;
 south side: Blanche River;
 west side: Nicolet River.

The Dumont river flows on  according to the following segmentsː
  west, then south, passing north of the village of Chesterville, to Chemin Craig Nord which crosses this village;
  to the southwest, crossing under the railway, to its mouth.

Toponymy 

The term "Dumont" constitutes a family name of French-speaking origin.

The toponym "rivière Dumont" was made official on September 5, 1985, at the Commission de toponymie du Québec.

See also 

 List of rivers of Quebec

References 

Arthabaska Regional County Municipality
Rivers of Centre-du-Québec